Opuntia stricta is a species of large cactus that is endemic to the subtropical and tropical coastal areas of the Americas, especially around the Caribbean. Common names include  erect prickly pear and nopal estricto (Spanish). The first description as Cactus strictus was published in 1803 by Adrian Hardy Haworth. In 1812 he moved the species to the genus Opuntia.

Description

It is quick to colonize hot, open environments with sandy soils. The bald, flattened, ovate to inverted egg-shaped, tapered at the base shoot sections are blue-green. The brownish areoles are far apart  leaving most of the epidermis, with often one or more yellowish spines, at least near the edges and towards the apex. The 1 to 5 awl-shaped spur is flattened, provided with a light barb at the top thorns are yellow.

The flowers are ephemeral and melliferous. The purple-red, smooth fruits are inverted-egg-shaped and tapered at the base. They are  inches long and covered with plenty of glochids and are more or less pyriform, always purple in color,  in length and contain from 60 to 180 seeds (which may remain viable for more than 10 years), yellow to light brown, incorporated into the fruit pulp. As fruits are appreciated by birds and mammals, their seeds are dispersed by animals. The mucilage inside the leaves is used to treat burns and abscesses. It is edible in the same way as fruits.

Distribution
Opuntia stricta occurs naturally in coastal beach scrub and sandy coastal environments in South Carolina, Georgia, Florida, and along the Gulf Coast in Texas, Mississippi, and Alabama in the United States, as well as Bermuda, the Caribbean, eastern Mexico, Central America, and northern South America (in Venezuela and Ecuador). O. stricta is a major component in the understory of Bahamian dry forests in the Bahamas and the Turks and Caicos Islands.

Invasive species

Opuntia stricta has been introduced to other parts of the world, including Africa (including Madagascar), Australia and southern Asia. O. stricta is considered an invasive species in South Africa and Kenya. In Australia it has been the subject of one of the first effective biological control exercises using the moth Cactoblastis cactorum. It was declared a Weed of National Significance by the Australian Weeds Committee in April 2012, but continues to be kept under control by the use of the Cactoblastis moth and a cochineal insect, Dactylopius opuntiae.

It has overgrown several hundreds of hectares  (acres) of sand dune areas and adjoining scrub forests and pasture lands. Some areas are so densely covered that they are completely inaccessible for humans and animals. The seeds are spread by macaque monkeys, and perhaps other animals and birds, that eat the large fruits. It is also spread by people cutting down the cactus but leaving the cuttings, which then re-sprout where they have fallen. The cactus is due to invade Yala National Park.

The opposite problem has been encountered in Texas, where Cactoblastis cactorum was first found in Brazoria County in 2017. This species of moth is highly destructive to this (and other) species of cactus native to the southern United States and northern Mexico.

See also
Bahamian dry forests
Prickly pears in Australia

References

External links

stricta
Cacti of South America
Flora of the Caribbean
Flora of the Dominican Republic
Flora of Central America
Flora of North America
Invasive plant species in Sri Lanka
Flora naturalised in Australia
Plants described in 1812
Flora of California